The Unfaithful is a 1947 murder mystery starring Ann Sheridan, Lew Ayres and Zachary Scott, and directed by Vincent Sherman. Regarded by some as a film noir, the picture is based on the W. Somerset Maugham-penned 1927 play and William Wyler-directed 1940 film The Letter, which was reworked and turned into an original screenplay by writers David Goodis and James Gunn.

Plot
Chris Hunter (Ann Sheridan) stabs a man in her home one night while her husband Bob is out of town. The dead man's name is Tanner and she claims not to know him and to have acted in self-defense.

Art shop owner, Martin Barrow (Steven Geray), contacts Chris's lawyer and good friend Larry Hannaford (Lew Ayres). Barrow shows Hannaford a bust of Chris Hunter's head, signed by Tanner, and attempts blackmail.  It turns out Tanner had been a sculptor, and it is now evident to Hannaford that Chris has lied about never knowing the man she killed.

After learning about the bust, Chris goes to Barrow to try to take possession of it.  But, Barrow has taken the piece to Tanner's wife (Marta Mitrovich), who is now convinced Chris had an affair with her husband and wants Chris punished for murder. Barrow convinces her to create more anguish for Chris by relaying this information to Bob Hunter (Zachary Scott), thinking also that the wronged husband would pay to avoid scandal. When Bob learns about the affair and sees the bust, he confronts Chris at home. After she admits to having an affair with Tanner while Bob was away during the war, he demands a divorce.

Chris is charged with murder and tried. Hannaford persuades the jury that while Chris was indeed guilty of adultery, she truly did stab Tanner in self-defense. Hannaford then convinces Bob, who has softened a bit on the idea of divorce after a long talk with his cousin, Paula,  and Chris to at least consider trying to save their marriage, rather than rushing into a divorce.

Cast
 Ann Sheridan as Chris Hunter
 Lew Ayres as Larry Hannaford
 Zachary Scott as Bob Hunter
 Eve Arden as Paula
 Jerome Cowan as Prosecuting Attorney
 Steven Geray as Martin Barrow
 John Hoyt as Det. Lt. Reynolds
 Peggy Knudsen as Claire
 Marta Mitrovich as Mrs. Tanner
 Douglas Kennedy as Roger
 Claire Meade as Martha
 Frances Morris as Agnes
 Jane Harker as Joan
 Heinie Conklin as Streetcar Passenger (uncredited)
 Jack Mower as Morrie (uncredited)
 Leo White as Courtroom Spectator (uncredited)

Reception

Box office
The film was highly successful at the box office.  According to Warner Bros records, the film cost $1,822,000 to produce and earned $1,939,000 domestically and $1,033,000 in foreign markets, registering a profit of $1,150,000.

Critical response
The New York Times gave the film a mixed review: "The Warner Brothers have turned out a better than average murder mystery in The Unfaithful, but they have badly over-weighted with melodramatics the things they obviously wanted to say about a pressing social problem. The new picture at the Strand stabs and jabs like a hit-and-run prizefighter at the subject of hasty divorces and the dangerous consequences to society of this ill conceived cure all for marital difficulties, but it never gets across a telling dramatic punch. However, through some uncommonly persuasive acting and skillful direction the patently artificial plot stands up surprisingly well."

Shown on the Turner Classic Movies show 'Noir Alley' with Eddie Muller on November 19, 2022.

References

External links
 
 
 
 
 

1947 films
1947 crime drama films
Adultery in films
American crime drama films
American black-and-white films
Film noir
Films scored by Max Steiner
American films based on plays
Films based on works by W. Somerset Maugham
Films directed by Vincent Sherman
Warner Bros. films
1940s English-language films
1940s American films